Christianshavn station is a rapid transit station on the Copenhagen Metro, served by the M1 and M2 lines. The station is located centrally in the Christianshavn district. It is located in fare zone 1 and opened in 2002. It is notable for having a different layout than other underground stations on the line. The platforms are much narrower, and the "diamonds" seen on street level are not present on this station.

The station has bicycle parking facilities.

External links
Christianshavn station on www.m.dk 
Christianshavn station on www.m.dk 

M1 (Copenhagen Metro) stations
M2 (Copenhagen Metro) stations
Railway stations opened in 2002
2002 establishments in Denmark
Railway stations in Denmark opened in the 21st century